Pieces of a Dream is an American R&B and jazz fusion group.

Overview
The group was formed in Philadelphia during 1976 by bassist Cedric Napoleon, drummer Curtis Harmon, and keyboardist James Lloyd who were all teenagers at the time. The group based their name on "Pieces of Dreams", a Michel Legrand tune recorded by Stanley Turrentine that they regularly performed. During 1981 Pieces of a Dream had a minor soul hit with 'Warm Weather' (vocals by singer Barbara Walker and synthesizer by Dexter Wansel) which was recorded on Elektra Records and co-produced by Dexter Wansel.  In late 1983, the group had their most successful single, "Fo-Fi-Fo", which peaked at No. 13 on the US soul chart.

The single "What Can I Do", from the album 'Bout Dat Time, with Norwood on the lead vocals, peaked at No. 17 on the Billboard Hot R&B Singles chart in February 1990.

Tracy Hamlin, was the group's lead vocalist from 2002 to 2005 and sings on two of their albums, Love Silhouette and No Assembly Required.

David Dyson has been the core bassist with the group from 2001 to the present and has also been a composer on "No Assembly Required", "Soul Intent", "In The Moment", "Just Funkin' Around", and "Fired Up". 
Gerald Veasley and Scott Ambush have shared the bass chair intermittently as well.

Discography

Studio albums

Compilation albums

References

External links
 Official website
Official site of David Dyson

Jazz fusion ensembles
Musical groups established in 1976
Musical groups from Philadelphia
Musical groups from Pennsylvania
American rhythm and blues musical groups
Smooth jazz ensembles
Heads Up International artists
Elektra Records artists